Phyllodesmium lizardense is a species of sea slug, an aeolid nudibranch, a marine gastropod mollusc in the family Facelinidae.

Distribution 
Known from Lizard Island, Queensland, Australia.

References

External links
 

Facelinidae
Gastropods described in 2008